Oncideres vitiliga is a species of beetle in the family Cerambycidae. It was described by Martins in 1981. It is known from Bolivia.

References

vitiliga
Beetles described in 1981